A jumper or jumper dress (in American English), pinafore dress or informally pinafore or pinny (British English) is a sleeveless, collarless dress intended to be worn over a blouse, shirt, T-shirt or sweater. Hemlines can be of different lengths and the type of collar and whether or not there is pleating are also variables in the design.

In British English, the term jumper describes what is called a sweater in American English. Also, in more formal British usage, a distinction is made between a pinafore dress and a pinafore. The latter, though a related garment, has an open back and is worn as an apron. In American English, pinafore always refers to an apron.

A sundress, like a jumper, is sleeveless and collarless; however, such articles are not worn over a blouse or sweater, and are of distinctly different cuts and fashions. The apron dress may be viewed as a special case of the jumper. If the design of the dress is directly inspired by an apron (having a bib in front and ties in the back, for example), the garment is typically described as an apron dress.

History 
Jumpers for fall were described in The Fort Wayne Sentinel in 1906. The dresses were "imported from Paris" and featured "original lines."

Jumpers in the United States were part of the sportswear collections of Jean Patou, Coco Chanel and Paul Poiret. Suzanne Lenglen wore Patou's jumper design in the 1920s. The dresses, worn over blouses, became popular during the decade of the 1920s. Jumpers were often worn in the summer and made out of various types of fabrics. 

Jumpers were touted as an "American" and a "sports fashion" in 1930 by the Pittsburgh Press. The dresses were also praised for allowing women to create color combinations through the choice of blouse worn underneath.

Jumpers were again popularized in 1953, when Hubert de Givenchy promoted his own jumper. Jumpers, now considered a "classic" look, were considered "suitable to all ages."

See also
 Gymslip – a British pinafore worn as athletic wear or school uniform
 Kirtle – a medieval garment of similar function
 Romper suit – combination of shorts and shirt
 Sarafan – a Russian jumper dress women wear when in tall grass or more often, farming

References

Citations

Sources

External links 
 1907 Jumper dress description and drawing

Dresses
lt:Džemperis